Ambulyx bima is a species of moth in the family Sphingidae. It was described by Rothschild and Jordan, in 1903, and is known from Indonesia.

Subspecies
Ambulyx bima bima (Sumbawa)
Ambulyx bima schmickae Brechlin, 1998 (Flores)
Ambulyx bima timoriana Brechlin, 2009 (Timor)

References

Ambulyx
Moths described in 1903
Moths of Indonesia